Mari Reitalu  (born February 10, 1941) is an Estonian botanist. She was a recipient of the Eerik Kumari Award in 1993.

References

1941 births
Living people
20th-century Estonian botanists
Estonian women scientists
Women botanists
20th-century Estonian women scientists
21st-century Estonian women scientists
21st-century Estonian botanists
Recipients of the Order of the White Star, 4th Class